The 1960 All-Ireland Senior Football Championship Final was the 73rd All-Ireland Final and the deciding match of the 1960 All-Ireland Senior Football Championship, an inter-county Gaelic football tournament for the top teams in Ireland.

Match

Summary
The game turned in Down's favour 11 minutes into the second half with Dan McCartan scoring a goal directly from a line ball; two minutes later Paddy Doherty scored a penalty.

This was Down's first ever appearance in an All-Ireland final, and it brought with it their first win. It was the first of three All-Ireland football titles won by Down in the 1960s, which made them joint "team of the decade" with Galway who also won three. Down won their next four All-Ireland football finals, with this run only broken in their sixth appearance, by a one-point defeat to Cork in 2010.

This was also the first championship meeting of Down and Kerry.

Down returned to that stage of the competition for the fiftieth anniversary, the 2010 All-Ireland Senior Football Championship Final.

Details

References

External links
 Down's historic All-Ireland win remembered 60 years on

All-Ireland Senior Football Championship Final
All-Ireland Senior Football Championship Final
All-Ireland Senior Football Championship Final, 1960
All-Ireland Senior Football Championship Finals
All-Ireland Senior Football Championship Finals
Down county football team matches
Kerry county football team matches